Mount Philo State Park is a state park located in Charlotte, Vermont. The  park protects the area around Mount Philo (968 feet high) and provides views of Lake Champlain and the Adirondack Mountains to the west. The Green Mountains (including Camel's Hump in the winter) can be seen to the east and south. It is accessed by trail or steep narrow road (seasonal).

Features
The park features hiking trails that lead from the base to the summit of Mount Philo. There is a mountaintop picnic area with views of Lake Champlain, the valley, and the Adirondack Mountains and Green Mountains to the west and south.

There is a small camping area with a total of 10 sites including 3 lean-tos, with restrooms and hot showers.

History
From the late 19th century to 1924, Mt. Philo was a popular destination for guests of the Mt. Philo Inn. It was accessed by carriage road and had a wooden observation tower at its summit.

The park was established in 1924 when Francies Humphreys of Brookline, Massachusetts, owner of the adjacent Mt. Philo Inn, donated the land to the State of Vermont for recreational use. This land would become Vermont's first state park. In 1929, the carriage road was improved and a summit picnic area was created. From 1935-1937, CCC (Civilian Conservation Corps) crews further enhanced the road and picnic area and built a ranger cabin and camping sites.  The park was listed on the National Register of Historic Places in 2001 for its importance in the state's recreational history, and for its CCC-related architecture.

Biology
From September to November, Mt. Philo is an excellent viewpoint for migrating raptors. Three main types can be viewed: falcons such as the kestrel and merlin; accipiters such as the cooper's hawk; and buteos such as the red-tailed hawk.

Geology
Mt. Philo sits atop the Champlain Thrust fault of Middle Ordivician age. It is made up of difficult to weather sedimentary rocks—the Cambrian Monkton Quartzites—that are thrust over younger Ordovician rocks of the Stony Point Formation.  The rocks that hold up Mt. Philo were originally deposited during the Cambrian on a passive margin in a warm shallow marine shelf setting along the east coast of Laurentia (Proto North America). These rocks have subsequently been thrust west during the Taconic Orogeny (~450 Ma) and perhaps again during the Acadian Orogeny (~350 Ma).

See also
National Register of Historic Places listings in Chittenden County, Vermont

References

External links 

 Park website
 Park geology

State parks of Vermont
Charlotte, Vermont
Protected areas of Chittenden County, Vermont
Historic districts on the National Register of Historic Places in Vermont
Civilian Conservation Corps in Vermont
National Register of Historic Places in Chittenden County, Vermont